Lili Dezou (born 8 July 2004) is a French rugby sevens player. She plays for Stade Toulousain Rugby. She was part of the French sevens squad that won a bronze medal at the 2022 Rugby World Cup Sevens in Cape Town.

References 

Living people
2004 births
French rugby sevens players
France international women's rugby sevens players